The Kawasaki Ki-78, originally given the designation Ken III (Kensan - research III), was a high-speed research aircraft (after research projects of long-range and high-altitude aircraft), also intended to attempt breaking the world absolute speed record.

Design and development
The Kawasaki Ki-78 was a high-speed research aircraft developed to investigate laminar profile wings with high wing loadings. Early in 1938 a high-speed research program was started at the Aeronautical Research Institute of the University of Tokyo for a small single-seat aircraft.

The Ki-78 was designed at the Aeronautical Research Institute and built at Kawasaki Kokuki Kogyo K.K. to investigate flying behaviour at very high speed.  It featured a streamlined minimum cross-section fuselage fitted with a licence-built Daimler-Benz DB 601A engine. For short durations, power boost methanol/water injection was used and cooling was improved by a  turbine driven cooling fan for the radiators.

All-metal construction was used in combination with a small thin wing with a laminar flow profile and a sharp leading edge.

Operational history
By the outbreak of the war, the whole project was taken over by the Imperial Japanese Army who gave it the military type designation Ki-78. Kawasaki received the order to build two prototypes of the Ki-78, construction of which was started in September 1941. The first was completed more than a year later and was flown for the first time on 26 December 1942. A feasibility study to improve the KI-78 flight performance showed that extensive airframe modifications were needed and consequently the project was officially terminated after the 32nd flight on 11 January 1944; the second Ki-78 was never completed.

Specifications (Ken III / Ki-78)

See also

References

Further reading
 Air Pictorial: 489. December 1986.

External links

Ki-78 article

1940s Japanese experimental aircraft
Ki-78